Crescent Air Cargo was an all-cargo airline based in Chennai, Tamil Nadu, India. Its main base was Chennai International Airport.

History
Crescent Air Cargo was incorporated as a Private Limited Company in January 2002, with its registered office at Chennai, though flight operations only began in 2004. In 2006, the airline was shut down again.

Destinations 
Crescent Air Cargo operated freight services to the following domestic and international destinations: 

Hyderabad - Rajiv Gandhi International Airport
Delhi - Indira Gandhi International Airport
Bengaluru - Bengaluru International Airport
Mumbai - Chhatrapati Shivaji International Airport
Visakhapatnam - Visakhapatnam Airport
Chennai - Chennai International Airport - base

Malé - Malé International Airport

Colombo - Bandaranaike International Airport

Fleet 
The Crescent Air Cargo fleet consisted of three Fokker 50 turboprop aircraft (in cargo configuration).

References 

Airlines established in 2004
Airlines disestablished in 2006
Cargo airlines
Defunct airlines of India
Indian companies disestablished in 2006
Indian companies established in 2004
2004 establishments in Tamil Nadu
Companies based in Chennai